James H. Morgan may refer to: 

 James H. Morgan (Medal of Honor) (1840–1877), American Civil War Medal of Honor recipient
 James H. Morgan (politician), member of the California State Assembly 1861–1862